Wichita Recordings is an independent record label located in London, founded in 2000 by Mark Bowen and Dick Green. Its most notable signees include Bloc Party, The Cribs, Clap Your Hands Say Yeah, Bright Eyes, My Morning Jacket, Yeah Yeah Yeahs, Best Coast, Los Campesinos! and Peter Bjorn and John. The label signed Clap Your Hands Say Yeah for a UK distribution deal for the group's debut album. They also signed the UK producers Simian Mobile Disco for the UK.

The label's first release was the Bright Eyes album Fevers and Mirrors, released in 2000.

Wichita Management runs alongside the label, and currently represents Gold Panda, Brolin, Shannon And The Clams, Open Mike Eagle, Cloud Nothings, Dan Tombs, Luke Abbott, Frankie & The Heartstrings, Peggy Sue, Star Slinger, Dam Mantle and Theo Verney.

2015 saw Wichita Recordings celebrate 15 years as a label, and have released new music from FIDLAR, Cheatahs, Meg Baird, Frankie & The Heartstrings, Girlpool, Waxahatchee and Total Babes.

2016 releases included Globelamp's debut LP The Orange Glow,  Mothers' debut LP When You Walk A Long Distance You Are Tired, and the debut from Oscar, Cut and Paste.

Current artists
 Cheatahs
 Cloud Nothings
 Espers
 Euros Childs
 FIDLAR
 Frankie & The Heartstrings
 Girlpool
 Gold Panda
 Greg Weeks
 Indoor Pets
 Los Campesinos!
 Lovvers
 Meg Baird
 Mothers
 Oscar
 Peggy Sue
 Ride
 Slow Club
 Swearin'
 Total Babes
 Waxahatchee
 Young Legionnaire

Former artists
 Best Coast
 Bloc Party
 The Blood Brothers
 Bright Eyes
 The Bumblebeez
 The Bronx
 Canyon
 Cate Le Bon
 Conor Oberst
 Brave Captain
 Clap Your Hands Say Yeah
 The Cribs
 Desaparecidos
 The Dodos
 The Drips
 Elastica
 First Aid Kit
 Giant Drag
 Globelamp
 Her Space Holiday
 Kele
 Kid606
 Les Savy Fav
 Lissy Trullie
 My Morning Jacket
 Northern State
 The Pattern
 Penfold Plum
 Peter Bjorn and John
 Peter Morén
Ruby
 Saul Williams
 Simian Mobile Disco
 Sky Larkin
 Spectrals
 Those Dancing Days
 Times New Viking
 Wauvenfold
 Weevil
 Wild Flag
 Yeah Yeah Yeahs

See also
:Category:Wichita Recordings albums
 List of record labels
 List of independent UK record labels

References

External links

Interview with founder Mark Bowen, HitQuarters September 2006
Smooth operators. The Guardian.
Wichita Recordings. Remix.
Declarations of independents. Music Week.

British independent record labels
Alternative rock record labels